The Isozaki Atea twin towers in Bilbao, Spain are the tallest residential buildings in the city and the Basque Country, designed by Japanese architect Arata Isozaki. The first two floors are used for mixed-commercial purposes, and the remaining floors are residential. The towers are part of a five-building complex. The other three buildings' heights range between six and eight floors.

"Atea" means "gate" in Basque; the complex is intended as the entrance to the Ensanche of the city from the other side of the Nervión river as a footway directly connects the staircase between the two towers to the Zubizuri footbridge. The staircase leads to Ercilla Street.

External links 

Emporis.com
 "Isozaki Atea" on Architecture News Plus

Buildings and structures in Bilbao
Twin towers
Skyscrapers in Bilbao
Residential skyscrapers in Spain
Estuary of Bilbao